The k'lông pút is a traditional bamboo xylophone of the Bahnar people in Vietnam. However, sound is produced through resonance by clapping at the end of the tubes, and not struck like many bar percussion instruments.

References

External links
"K'long Put", VietnamTourism.com. Accessed: 14 August 2018.

Vietnamese musical instruments
Bamboo musical instruments
Pitched percussion instruments